Bartok the Magnificent is a 1999 American direct-to-video animated adventure comedy film directed by Don Bluth and Gary Goldman. It is a spin-off to the 1997 film Anastasia which was also directed by Bluth and Goldman.

The film centers on the kidnapping of the young czar prior to the Russian Revolution. Hank Azaria reprises his role from the previous film as Bartok, a bumbling small albino bat, who becomes a magician.

While several of Bluth's films have received sequels, spin-offs and television shows, this is the only such project he has been involved with.

Plot 
Bartok the Magnificent, an albino bat magician and a con artist, arrives in Moscow and makes himself known by performing for the locals. His grand finale involves defeating a savage grizzly bear. Delighted with Bartok's bravery, the young czar Ivan Romanov gifts Bartok with a royal ring, much to the chagrin of Ivan's assistant, Ludmilla. After the show, Bartok counts his earnings and is startled by the stirring bear, revealed to be his business partner, Zozi. Although Zozi is apprehensive about the ring and tells Bartok that he should return it, Bartok refuses stating that it was a gift.

When Ivan is captured by the witch Baba Yaga, there is an immediate investigation. In seeking a rescuer, two children nominate Bartok, who, with Zozi, was already on his way to St. Petersburg when spotted by Cossacks. Bartok is brought before the townspeople, who are relying on his courage to save Ivan. Reluctantly, Bartok accepts, and he and Zozi set out for the Iron Forest. Upon arriving at Baba Yaga's hut, the duo must answer a riddle given by the entrance, a giant skull. With the riddle solved, Bartok is then captured by Baba Yaga, who explains that, in order to save Ivan, Bartok must retrieve three artifacts from the forest, without any assistance: her pet Piloff, Oble's Crown and the Magic Feather. However, Bartok quickly finds that these tasks are difficult, as Piloff is frozen to a boulder; Oble, a giant blacksmith surrounded by an aura of fire, must be tricked into letting his crown be stolen; and the Magic Feather must be obtained without flight, utilizing only the previous two items.

Returning to Baba Yaga with the objectives completed, the witch reveals that she needs something from Bartok himself. Baba Yaga rejects all his offers and, outraged, Bartok lashes out at her, accusing her of lying and cheating, and claiming that everyone hates her. Suddenly stricken with guilt, Bartok apologizes and cries, allowing Baba Yaga to obtain the most important ingredient: tears from the heart. She conjures up a potion from the objects, and reveals that she never kidnapped Ivan and that the potion was intended for Bartok himself; it will make whatever he is in his heart ten times on the outside. Bartok and Zozi return to town and lead Ludmilla and Vol, the Captain of the Guard, up to the top of the tower, where Ivan is imprisoned.

Ludmilla locks Bartok and Vol in with Ivan, revealing that she had Vol kidnap the prince while she framed Baba Yaga as part of her plan to steal the throne. She steals Bartok's potion and leaves her prisoners in a well tower, which quickly floods with water. Ludmilla consumes the potion, thinking that her beauty will become tenfold. The potion, in fact, causes her to transform into a dragon, as it unveils her true wickedness. After seeing her reflection, Ludmilla's mind degrades to a mere beast, and she goes on a rampage, burning the town with her fiery breath.

Zozi comes and rescues Bartok, Ivan and Vol. Bartok battles Ludmilla and tricks her into climbing the tower. When she reaches the top, the tower crumbles, crushing Ludmilla and unleashing a wave of gushing water that douses the flames. As the townsfolk gather around the wreckage, Zozi hails Bartok as a true hero, not only for defeating Ludmilla but also for showing Baba Yaga compassion. Bartok returns Ivan's ring and Bartok bids Baba Yaga and Piloff goodbye, undoubtedly counting on seeing him again someday.

Cast 
 Hank Azaria as Bartok the Magnificent
 Kelsey Grammer as Zozi, the Grizzly Bear.
 Catherine O'Hara as Ludmilla
 Andrea Martin as Baba Yaga
 Tim Curry as The Skull, the entrance/guard to Baba Yaga's hut.
 Jennifer Tilly as Piloff, Baba Yaga's pet
 French Stewart as Oble
 Phillip Van Dyke as Tsar Ivan Romanov
 Diedrich Bader as Vol, Ivan's friend and the Captain of the Guard.
 Glenn Shadix as Townspeople Ensemble
 Danny Mann as Head Cossack
 Zachary B. Charles as Little Boy
 Kelly Marie Berger as Little Girl

Bartok's master in Anastasia, Grigori Rasputin, makes a silent cameo appearance among the many townsfolk who gather around the wreckage of Ludmilla's crashed tower during the film's epilogue.

Production 
A spin-off film was devised as "Hollywood audiences went batty over the impish Bartok in Fox's 1997 animated musical Anastasia". Chris Meledandri, then-president of 20th Century Fox Animation, said: "Once we thought about a lot of ideas, our favorite idea was the one you see".

Music
The film's songs were written by Stephen Flaherty and Lynn Ahrens, both returning from Anastasia.

Songs

Release

Marketing 
In late 1999, pancake purveyor IHOP started selling two versions of Bartok, as part of promotion. The company planned "to sell about 500,000 of the six-inch-high toys - Bartok Puppet and Turban Bartok - for $2.99 with any food purchase". It was "also offering $2 mail-in rebate coupons for the $20 video...and free activity books for children".

Home media 
Bartok the Magnificent was first released on VHS and DVD by 20th Century Fox Home Entertainment on November 16, 1999, and was later re-released in 2005 as part of a 2-disc set alongside Anastasia entitled Family Fun Edition. Bartok the Magnificent was also included as a special feature on Anastasia Blu-ray, released in March 2011.

The tape and DVD conclude with sing-along segments that reprise the original tunes by Stephen Flaherty and Lynn Ahrens" - "Bartok the Magnificent", "A Possible Hero", "Someone's in My House" and "Once Upon a December" (from Anastasia). Other DVD extras also include Bartok and Anastasia trailers, and a Maze Game that features three mazes.

 Visual and audio
The aspect ratio is 1.33:1 – Full Frame. The DVD release has the original aspect ratio, and it is not anamorphic. As the source is video and not film, and because there is no widescreen aspect ratio available, the quality is at the same level of the original film. Digitally Obsessed says: "The colors are nicely rendered, with a minimum of bleeding" but when viewed on "a 115 foot projection screen through a progressive scan player...the image was fairly grainy and uneven". The film has English and French audio. Digitally Obsessed says: "The DS2.0 mix is more than adequate for this fun little bat romp [though there is a] lack of directionality in the mix. The dialogue is clear and center speaker weighted". It concluded by saying "this is a great DVD for kids, because besides just watching the movie they can enjoy the three sing-alongs or try to find Prince Ivan in the mazes. Bartok teaches moral values in a way that kids can understand". According to LoveFilm, the film has been dubbed into English, German, French, Spanish, Italian, Swedish, and Dutch. It has subtitles in Dutch, French, German, Italian, Spanish, and Swedish. Fort Worth Star-Telegram implied this was one of the rare direct-to-video films that is great quality, saying "the made-for-tape bin can yield an undiscovered bargain [such as] Bartok the Magnificent". Lexington Herald-Leader said "to my surprise...the movie overall [is] quite good".

Critical response 
Dan Jardine of Apollo Guide gave the film a score of 71 out of 100. Michael Dequina of The Movie Report wrote a review in which he scored it 1.5 out of 4, writing the film as uninspired and short fun adventure for kids, but boring for everyone else. Family Video said that "the film is marked by imaginative scenery, catchy songs, comic characters and Bartok's own funny and neurotic commentary". Hartford Courant described the film as "enjoyable". Indianapolis Star said "'Bartok' is quite good for video-only release". Digitally Obsessed gave the film a Style grade of B+, Substance rating of A, Image Transfer rating of C, Audio Transfer rating of B, and Extras rating of B+ - averaging out to a B+ rating of the film as a whole. It said "Stephen Flaherty's score is very nice". On Love Film, the film has a rating of three of five stars based on 222 member ratings.

John Laydon of Variety explained: "Tykes will likely be charmed by the brisk pacing, vibrant (albeit stereotypical) characters and engaging storyline, while parents may be especially grateful for a cartoon with much better production values than Pokémon". He noted "even very small children will notice early on that Ludmilla...a duplicitous regent, is the real villain of the piece". He said co-directors Bluth and Goldman "do a respectable job of establishing what promises to be a new direct-to-video franchise", also adding that "though certainly not as lavish as its bigscreen predecessor Anastasia, the sequel is attractive and involving, with Tim Curry and Jennifer Tilly  well cast as supporting-character voices". He said Azaria has "amusing brio", while Grammer "is the real scene-stealer this time". He described the songs as "pleasant but unremarkable". Fort Oglethorpe Press described the film as "spectacular", "frolicking" and "fun-filled", adding that it is "loaded with breathtaking, feature-quality animation", and "spectacular music", and "enchanting new songs".

The Trades questioned its existence, saying: "I am unsure what reason this spin-off was made, but regardless, it was a well done one". It added that "the same team directed and produced the second movie, and unlike many direct to video movies, it is animated as well as the first and uses a healthy portion of CGI, something many movies of that nature tend to lack. Backgrounds have the same detail as the original movie, making this a definite worthwhile watch". The Dallas Morning News notes "Bartok the Magnificent does even more disservice to Russian history than Anastasia did".

Accolades 
Bartok the Magnificent was nominated for "Outstanding Achievement in an Animated Home Video Production" at the 28th Annie Awards in 2000, losing to Disney's An Extremely Goofy Movie. It also received Gold Reel Award nominations for "Best Sound Editing" for both television films and direct-to-video presentations from the Motion Picture Sound Editors that same year, beaten by Shake, Rattle and Roll: An American Love Story and Alvin and the Chipmunks Meet Frankenstein, respectively.

References

External links 

 
 
 

1999 animated films
1999 films
1999 direct-to-video films
1990s American animated films
1999 fantasy films
1990s musical films
American children's animated fantasy films
American children's animated musical films
Anastasia (franchise)
20th Century Fox animated films
20th Century Fox Animation films
20th Century Fox direct-to-video films
Fox Animation Studios films
Albinism in popular culture
American direct-to-video films
Cultural depictions of Grand Duchess Anastasia Nikolaevna of Russia
1990s children's fantasy films
Direct-to-video animated films
Film spin-offs
Films about bats
Animated films about shapeshifting
Films based on Russian folklore
Films directed by Don Bluth
Films produced by Don Bluth and Gary Goldman
Films directed by Gary Goldman
Films set in Moscow
Baba Yaga
Animated films about bears
Animated films about dragons
Animated films based on Slavic mythology
1990s children's animated films
1990s English-language films